In These Veins is the 4th album by the Swedish melodic death metal band Hearse.

Track listing
 "House of Love"  - 06:07
 "Corroding Armor"  - 05:07
 "Intoxication"  - 03:28
 "Naked Truth"  - 04:04
 "Crusade"  - 02:56
 "Among The Forlorn"  - 04:24
 "Atrocious Recoil"  - 04:19
 "Hearse"  - 02:46
 "In These Veins"  - 05:15
 "Mayfly Euphoria" (Japanese Bonus Track) - 05:23

Credits

Hearse
Johan Liiva - vocals
Mattias Ljung - lead guitar
Max Thornell - drums, rhythm guitar and bass guitar

Other Personnel
Dan Swanö - mastering
Pär Johansson - cover art

2006 albums
Hearse (band) albums